Building at 303 Saluda Avenue, also known as John C. Heslep House, is a historic home located at Columbia, South Carolina. It was built about 1917 as a two-story brick residence, then remodeled and rebuilt in the Spanish Colonial Revival style in 1927–1928. It features a low-pitched tile roof, coarse stucco walls, and cast iron balconies.  Also on the property is a contributing guest house.

It was added to the National Register of Historic Places in 1982.

References

Mission Revival architecture in South Carolina
Houses completed in 1928
National Register of Historic Places in Columbia, South Carolina
Houses on the National Register of Historic Places in South Carolina